Under a presidential decree in 2005, Indonesia has categorised 92 geographically isolated and distant islands as pulau terluar or "outlying islands". 67 of them are close to a neighbouring country, and 28 are inhabited.

List

Statistics

Bordering countries 
Indonesia's outlying islands share borders with the following 9 countries:

Provinces 
These outlying islands are located in one of the following 18 provinces:

Potential disputes 
According to Indonesia, amongst these outlying islands, 12 might be claimed by another nation:

See also 

 Foreign relations of Indonesia
 Indonesia–Malaysia border
 Indonesian Small Islands Directory

References

External links 
 

Outlying
Outlying
 Islands